Jelenja Vas is a settlement north of Stari Trg ob Kolpi in southern Slovenia. It belongs to the Municipality of Kočevje. The area is part of the traditional region of Lower Carniola and is now included in the Southeast Slovenia Statistical Region.

References

External links
Jelenja Vas on Geopedia

Populated places in the Municipality of Kočevje